A house plan is a set of construction or working drawings (sometimes called blueprints) that define all the construction specifications of a residential house such as the dimensions, materials, layouts, installation methods and techniques.

Drawing set

The principal information provided in set of blueprint drawings are as follows:

 Site plans are drawn to show the location of a home on the property in its context. It is an overhead view of the construction site and the home as it sits in reference to the boundaries of the lot. Site plans should outline location of utility services, setback requirements, easements, location of driveways and walkways, and sometimes even topographical data that specifies the slope of the terrain.
A floor plan is an overhead view of the completed house. On the plan, you will see parallel lines that scale at whatever width the walls are required to be. Dimensions are usually drawn between the walls to specify room sizes and wall lengths. Floor plans will also indicate rooms, all the doors and windows and any built-in elements, such as plumbing fixtures, cabinets, water heaters, furnaces, etc. Floor plans will include notes to specify finishes, construction methods, or symbols for electrical items.
Elevations are a non-perspective view of the home. These are drawn to scale so that measurements can be taken for any aspect necessary. Plans include front, rear and both side elevations. The elevations specify ridge heights, the positioning of the final fall of the land, exterior finishes, roof pitches and other details that are necessary to give the home its exterior architectural styling.
A section cuts through the dwelling and the location of this 'cut through' is noted on the floor plan. It describes how the building will be constructed and discusses how the internal finishes are to look. Sections are used because they explain certain conditions in more detail. These conditions may include ceiling height, ceiling type (flat or vault), and window and door dimensions.
 Foundation plan, including dimensions and locations for footings.
 Framing plan, for wall, including the size of the lumber to be used - usually 2x4 or 2x6.
 The Sub-floor Plan gives details of how this area will be constructed and how services will be arranged.
 Roof plans, including type, pitch and framing.
 Interior elevation drawings (interior walls).
 Detail drawings, such as built-in shelving, moldings, and columns.
 Schedules for elements such as windows and doors.
 Structural layouts.
 Electrical and telecoms drawings: show locations of all the outlets, TV sockets, switches and fixtures.  Also indicates which switches operate which lights, and where the electric lines should be run,.
 Plumbing schematic drawing: plumbing fixtures and piping.
 Subdivision plans also known as an allotment plans or Strata plans. Show information regarding adjoining properties.

Lines and symbols 
House plans use the following lines and symbols to convey the relationship between objects:
 Dimension lines, which consist of a solid line with a mark at either end; space between the two marks equals the distance noted next to the line.
 Wall, thick solid lines between rooms are used to indicate a wall.
 Partial height wall, a low wall that doesn't extend all the way up to the ceiling.
 Thin solid lines are used for built-in structures (such as cabinets, bookshelves, or plumbing fixtures).
 Thin dotted lines indicate overhead features, such as wall cabinets in a kitchen or a special ceiling treatment or an archway in the living room.
 North arrow
 Doors:
 Door swing
 Bifold doors
 Passage (hinged) doors
 Sliding glass door
 French door
 Window, small breaks between exterior walls often indicate a window
 Toilet, often indicated as a circle adjacent to a rectangle in the bathroom
 Bathtub, often indicated as a large oval or rectangle when indicating a tub/shower combination
 Shower, a rectangular or square shape with an X running through it
 Bathroom sink, a rectangle with an oval and a dot in the center if it is a single vanity.
 Kitchen sink
 Kitchen range
 Refrigerator, a small square with 'ref.' worded on it to signify the location placement of the refrigerator
 Washer/Dryer
 Tree
 Shrub

Spaces and rooms 

House plans generally include the following features, depending on the size and type of house:
 Bedroom
 Bathroom
 Kitchen
 Hall
Laundry room
Living room (as known as a great room or family room)

Open floor plan 

An open floor plan is one which values wide, unenclosed spaces. They are made possible by curtain wall technology, engineered lumber and truss systems, and thoughtful structural design which allow for larger clear-spans than formerly possible in residential construction.

An open floor plan limits or excludes walls separating the main living areas of the house (living room, dining room, kitchen) to allow for entertaining or interaction between family.

External links 

Drawing
Technical drawing
Plan